The South Chahar Autonomous Government was a puppet state of the Empire of Japan, as well as an administratively autonomous component of Mengjiang from its creation in 1937 to its complete merger in 1939. Following the Japanese invasion of China in July 1937, regional governments were established in Japanese-occupied territories. After Operation Chahar in September 1937, which extended Japanese control to northern Shanxi region, more formal control of the area was established through the creation of the North Shanxi Autonomous Government, as well as the South Chahar Autonomous Government to the east of Shanxi.

History 
On August 27, 1937, the Kwantung Army occupied Kalgan, the capital of the Chahar Province of the Republic of China. Sir Yu Pinqing, who was an executive member of the Zhangjiakou Shokai, was invited by the Japanese Army and appointed as a member of the Zhangjiaguchi Security Maintenance Committee based there. On September 4, the South Chahar Autonomous Government was established by the Zhangjiakou Security Maintenance Association. Kalgan was chosen as the capital (since it already functioned as a provisional one), and 10 prefectures in the southern part of Chahar Province (Xuanhua County, Wanquan County, Huai'an County, Zhuolu County, Yu County, Yangyuan County, Chicheng County, Ryuseki County, Enkei County, Huailai County) were absorbed into it.

In addition to the South Chahar Autonomous Government, the Mongol United Autonomous Government and the North Shanxi Autonomous Government were established in the Mengjiang area at the same time. These three autonomous governments established the Mongolian Union Committee to facilitate each other's integration. However, this committee did not function well. Therefore, in September 1939, the three governments were merged into the newly established Mengjiang United Autonomous Government. At the same time, the South Chahar Autonomous Government was reorganized as the South Chahar Government Office and incorporated into the administrative divisions of the new government, and the South Chahar's Government Office was renamed to the Ministry of Xuanhua in 1943.

Politics 
In the South Chahar Autonomous Government, two supreme members elected from the political affairs committee played the role of administrative leaders. In addition, there were departments of the General Affairs Office, the Civil Affairs Agency, the Finance Agency, the National Safety Agency, and the Civil Affairs Agency, and the director was appointed as the head of each department. In addition, Japanese people were dispatched to each department of the autonomous government as advisors so that they could interfere with the country's administration, further solidifying the country's status as a Japanese puppet state.

People 
The key people in the Chahar government were as follows:

Chief Advisor: Motohei Takeuchi
Supreme Commissioner: Yu Pinqing, Du Yunyu
Minister Without Portfolio: Yu Pinqing, Du Yunyu, Yunyu Minami, Xiang Xiao, Satoshi Shaen, Hanun, Jinqi Chung, Han Yufeng
Manager of General Affairs: Chen Yuming
Director of the Agency of Civil Affairs: Chen Yuming
Director of the Agency of Civil Affairs: Roh Kagami
Director of the Finance Agency: Yang Jin Voice
Director of the National Safety Agency: Kazuya Takaki

See also 

Mengjiang
Japanese imperialism
North Shanxi Autonomous Government

References 

 
States and territories disestablished in 1939
Client states of the Empire of Japan
Former countries in Chinese history
Former countries in East Asia
States and territories established in 1937
Japan–Mongolia relations
 
History of Zhangjiakou